The long-tailed cinclodes (Cinclodes pabsti) is a species of bird in the family Furnariidae. It is endemic to Brazil.

Its natural habitats are temperate grassland and pastureland. Rarer than previously believed, it is uplisted from a species of Least Concern to Near Threatened status in the 2007 IUCN Red List.

The scientific name commemorates the Brazilian botanist Guido Frederico João Pabst.

Footnotes

References
 BirdLife International (2007a): [ 2006-2007 Red List status changes ]. Retrieved 2007-AUG-26.
 BirdLife International (2007b): Long-tailed Cinclodes - BirdLife Species Factsheet. Retrieved 2007-AUG-26.

long-tailed cinclodes
Birds of the Atlantic Forest
Endemic birds of Brazil
long-tailed cinclodes
long-tailed cinclodes
Taxonomy articles created by Polbot